The 1975–76 season was Kilmarnock's 74th in Scottish League Competitions. They finished runners up in the Scottish First Division and were promoted to the Premier Division.

Scottish First Division

Scottish League Cup

Group stage

Group 4 final table

Scottish Cup

Spring Cup

Group stage

See also
List of Kilmarnock F.C. seasons

References

External links
Kilmarnock Results For Season 1873/1874

Kilmarnock F.C. seasons
Kilmarnock